Diplomatic Immunity is the debut studio album by American hip hop group the Diplomats, released via The Island Def Jam Music Group, Jay-Z's Roc-A-Fella Records, and Cam'ron's Diplomat Records. Originally scheduled for a March 11, 2003 release, the album was ultimately released March 25, 2003. After the release of group leader Cam'ron's third album, Come Home With Me, the quartet teamed up to release their first collaborative effort. The album features the lead singles "Dipset Anthem", "Built This City", and "Bout It Bout It... Part III" (featuring Master P). Diplomatic Immunity was the only album by The Diplomats released under Island Def Jam and Roc-A-Fella, as they left the labels in 2004 to go independent. 

In addition to Master P, the album features appearances from Monique Chandler, Shaniqua Williams, Toya, Freeway, DMX, and fellow Diplomat rapper Hell Rell, who was incarcerated at the time of the album's release. The album debuted and peaked at number 8 on the Billboard 200 selling 92,000 copies in its first week. The album was certified Gold by the RIAA. In 2012 Complex named the album one of the classic albums of its decade.

Cam'ron described the album as "9/11 music," and it antagonized the country in the attack's aftermath while adopting its imagery. On "Gangsta," Juelz Santana compares himself to Osama bin Laden, and an original version of "I Love You" praised Mohamed Atta.

Track listing

Charts

Weekly charts

Year-end charts

Certifications

References

2003 debut albums
The Diplomats albums
Albums produced by the Heatmakerz
Albums produced by Kanye West
Albums produced by Just Blaze
Def Jam Recordings albums
Roc-A-Fella Records albums
Diplomat Records albums